DeRidder is a city in, and the parish seat of, Beauregard Parish, Louisiana, United States. A small portion of the city extends into Vernon Parish. As of the 2010 census DeRidder had a population of 10,578. It is the smaller principal city of the Fort Polk South-DeRidder CSA, a Combined Statistical Area that includes the Fort Polk South (Vernon Parish) and DeRidder (Beauregard Parish) micropolitan areas, which had a combined population of 87,988 at the 2010 census.

History 
DeRidder was named for Ella de Ridder, the sister-in-law of a Dutch railroad financier, Jan de Goeijen (cf. De Queen, Arkansas). Her family originally came from the small town of Geldermalsen in the Netherlands, where she was one of 13 children. She ran away from home at an early age and was presumed dead by her family, who only later discovered that she had traveled to the United States. The town was named for her by her brother-in-law, who brought the first railroad to that area of Louisiana. Prior to that, the little town was known as Schovall. The first train line to serve DeRidder came in 1897. It was the Pittsburgh & Gulf Railroad, later called the Kansas City Southern.

The July 26, 1924, the DeRidder Enterprise stated: "The first house in DeRidder was made of logs and covered with board shingles, split by hand from the logs of the forest. It was constructed in 1893 and was the old homestead house of Calvin Shirley, who was the original owner of the land upon which the first business house and residence of DeRidder were built.

According to Eva Stewart Frazar, whose family came to DeRidder near the turn of the century, "The largest pine in the world grew where DeRidder now stands - or so it is claimed by timber men who knew."

About the origin of the town, she says, "the Kansas City railroad was built from Kansas City to Port Arthur - and came right through here about 1896. By 1898 the trains were running. The post-office was named Miersburg for the postmaster whose name was Miers. The railroad workers had used this spot for a camping place for the workmen - and people wanted to get near the railroad - so  of land was bought for the town site."

"Immediately following the purchase of the town site, a ramble of rough houses were hurriedly built out of rough lumber... By 1898 the town consisted of nearly 300 people and a number of shack homes and a sawmill. C. Landry and Mr. George Heard had a hotel. There were about 5 small stores, besides. West Brothers had a Rous Racket store on the east side of the track."

By this time DeRidder had a sawmill, and timber was the prime industry of the area. The longleaf pine was the primary tree used in the industry. In 1903, DeRidder was finally incorporated as a town.

In April 1904, a large portion of the business section of DeRidder was destroyed by fire. The cause was apparently arson. A grand jury collected enough evidence for this to indict George Smith, a gambler, with setting the fire. The man reportedly left town.

DeRidder's first bank opened in 1906.  On October 15, 1912, DeRidder was voted the parish seat of Beauregard Parish. The Beauregard Parish Court House and the Beauregard Parish Jail (see below) were built in 1914.

Geography
U.S. Route 190 leads south and east  to Kinder and west  to Jasper, Texas.

Split Parish
The northern section of the Green Acres subdivision, west of highway 171 on the extreme northwest side of DeRidder, extends into Vernon Parish. Another section of the city, running north along the east side highway 171, up to a parallel with Golden Lantern road, also extends into Vernon Parish. Water and sewage for Green Acres and Country Estates Subdivisions is provided by the independent Green Acres Water & Sewer District #1

Transportation
 Beauregard Regional Airport

Culture

The building known as the "Old Beauregard Parish Jail" is a structure built in 1914 that is considered one of the most distinctive of its type in the US. The structure has the characteristics of the collegiate Gothic Revival architectural style, with shallow arches, dormer windows, and a central tower. This style was popular with colleges, universities, and churches. The iron bars in most of the windows give the structure an eerie appearance. Inside, there is a spiral staircase that leads up to three floors of jail cells. Another history-making fact is that each cell had a toilet, shower, lavatory and window. When the jail was in use, prisoners could often be seen waving from the barred windows.

It was built to house 50 or so prisoners, but held 13 in comfort. The first floor has quarters for the jailer and his family. In the jail's basement, a long corridor leads to the courthouse next door.

In 1928, there was a famous double execution by hanging in the jail for two murderers. These were the only recorded hangings in the jail. The prisoners were hanged by an apparatus at the top of the spiral staircase. After this the jail became known as "the hanging jail".

The jail was used until 1982, when a court action forced it to close. On October 4, 1981, it was put on the National Register of Historic Places, along with several other buildings in DeRidder.

Historic District

In 1983 Washington, Second, Stewart, and Port streets were added to the National Register of Historic Places listings in Beauregard Parish as the DeRidder Commercial Historic District.

Demographics

2020 census

As of the 2020 United States census, there were 9,852 people, 3,838 households, and 2,510 families residing in the city.

2000 census
As of the census of 2000, there were 9,808 people, 3,819 households, and 2,616 families residing in the city. The racial makeup of the city was 60.81% White, 34.73% African American, 0.57% Native American, 1.42% Asian, 0.03% Pacific Islander, 0.57% from other races, and 1.88% from two or more races. Hispanic or Latino of any race were 2.40% of the population.

There were 3,819 households, out of which 33.3% had children under the age of 18 living with them, 48.6% were married couples living together, 16.9% had a female householder with no husband present, and 31.5% were non-families. 28.1% of all households were made up of individuals, and 11.7% had someone living alone who was 65 years of age or older. The average household size was 2.48 and the average family size was 3.03.

In the city of DeRidder, the population was spread out, with 27.1% under the age of 18, 8.6% from 18 to 24, 27.3% from 25 to 44, 22.4% from 45 to 64, and 14.5% who were 65 years of age or older. The median age was 37 years. For every 100 females, there were 89.2 males. For every 100 females age 18 and over, there were 83.3 males.

The median income for a household in the city was $31,952, and the median income for a family was $39,384. Males had a median income of $36,388 versus $21,302 for females. The per capita income for the city was $16,996. About 15.0% of families and 18.0% of the population were below the poverty line, including 22.1% of those under age 18 and 18.2% of those age 65 or over.

Education
Beauregard Parish School Board operates local public schools.

For the city of DeRidder these schools are:

Grades 9–12 DeRidder High School  (DeRidder) 
Grades 6–8 DeRidder Junior High School (DeRidder)
Grades 4 & 5 Pine Wood Elementary School (DeRidder)
Grades 2 & 3 G. W. Carver Elementary School (DeRidder)
PreK - 1st Grade K. R. Hanchey Elementary School (DeRidder)

Media 
The Beauregard Daily News, a daily newspaper, is based in DeRidder.

Notable people
 Bert A. Adams, state representative from Vernon Parish from 1956 to 1968; born in DeRidder in 1916
Joe W. Aguillard, president of Louisiana College in Pineville 2005 - 2014; Beauregard Parish school superintendent, 1999-2000
Allen Bradley, state representative from 1984 to 1992; lawyer and businessman and former DeRidder City Council member
Mel Branch, college/professional football player – LSU/Dallas Texans/Kansas City Chiefs/Miami Dolphins
Chris Cagle, collegiate and professional football player in College Football Hall of Fame
Chris Cagle, country music singer
Jerry DeWitt, former Pentecostal minister and current author, public speaker and leader of the American atheism movement
Rusty Hamer, former child actor who committed suicide in DeRidder in 1990
Gilbert Franklin Hennigan, former Louisiana state senator
Johnny Jones, college basketball head coach at University of North Texas and LSU
Michael Mayes, former NFL player
Michael Sanders, college/NBA basketball player – UCLA/Kansas City Kings/Cleveland Cavaliers
Charles Emery Tooke, Jr., state senator for DeSoto and Caddo parishes, 1948 to 1956; Shreveport lawyer, born in DeRidder in 1912
Jennifer Weiner, author
Deshazor Everett, college/professional football player – Texas A&M/Washington Redskins

References

External links 
 
 Beauregard Parish History
 Historic DeRidder: Downtown Walking Tour, a pamphlet published by the Beauregard Tourist Commission (June 2000).

Cities in Louisiana
Parish seats in Louisiana
Cities in Beauregard Parish, Louisiana
Cities in Vernon Parish, Louisiana
Cities in the Central Louisiana